Joustra is a Dutch surname. Notable people with the surname include:

Arendo Joustra (b. 1957), Dutch writer and journalist
Jan Joustra, Australian dean
Marten Joustra, British composer
Tjibbe Joustra (b. 1951), Dutch civil servant
Joustra Tarigan

Dutch-language surnames